Oakley Wood is a  biological Site of Special Scientific Interest west of Hathern in Leicestershire.

This site provides the only example in the county of the transition from oak woodland on free draining acid soil to the ash and hazel typical of the heavy clays of eastern central England. Rides add to the variety of flora, with woodland species such as lily of the valley and yellow archangel.

The site is private land with no public access.

References

Sites of Special Scientific Interest in Leicestershire